The Hurd–Mori 1,2,3-thiadiazole synthesis is a name reaction in organic chemistry that allows for the generation of 1,2,3-thiadiazoles through the reaction of N-acylated or tosyl hydrazone derivatives with thionyl chloride.

References

Carbon-heteroatom bond forming reactions
Name reactions